Allan Sanders (31 January 1934 – February 2015), often spelt Alan Sanders, was an English professional footballer who made 228 Football League appearances playing as a full back for Everton, Swansea Town and Brighton & Hove Albion. He was on the books of Manchester City without making a league appearance, and also played in South Africa for Cape Town City.

References

1934 births
2015 deaths
Footballers from Salford
English footballers
Association football defenders
Manchester City F.C. players
Everton F.C. players
Swansea City A.F.C. players
Brighton & Hove Albion F.C. players
Cape Town City F.C. (NFL) players
English Football League players
National Football League (South Africa) players
English expatriates in South Africa
Expatriate soccer players in South Africa